The rota or "turn" is a cylinder, open on one side, that is built inside a wall of a monastery, nunnery or foundling hospital. It was used for exchanging mail and food with cloistered clergy, being  their only communication with the world. It is usually about 50 centimeters wide by 30 centimeters high, and its opening does not permit visual or tactile contact with the uncloistered. Messages or food are put into the cylinder, then the rota is revolved so that the opening faces the other side. 

Monks were stationed close by or are notified that someone has turned the wheel by various mechanisms. In some cases, especially at night and in winter, the rota is filled by the monks with food, and left there for the poor, to give them something to eat without them having to ask. The rota has also been used by those mothers who don't want to (or couldn't) keep their (often illegitimate) newborn babies. They left them in the safe hands of monks or nuns, their anonymity being guaranteed by the rota. In some Church dioceses the instrument was abolished to discourage this latter use.

References

Christian monastic architecture